Şahan Gökbakar (born 22 October 1980) is a Turkish comedian, actor and producer.

Early life
Born in İzmir, Gökbakar grew up in Turkey's capital, Ankara, attending the primary school and high school attached to the Middle East Technical University (ODTÜ). After completing high school in 1997, he went on to study acting at Bilkent University's Faculty of Music and Performing Arts in Ankara. After graduating in 2002, he moved to Istanbul.

Career

Television 
After making himself known to Turkish audiences with his Candid Camera-style show, Zoka, he became hugely popular with his sketch comedy series, "Dikkat Şahan Çıkabilir", in which he portrayed many different characters. After concluding the series on 2006 after two successful seasons on two different networks, he went on to shoot a late night talk show at NTV, named "Kime Diyorum Ben." 

His sketches, especially from "Dikkat Şahan Çıkabilir" are still widely circulated and watched in YouTube and other social media platforms, achieving near-cult status in Turkey. The main character of his record setting movie series, Recep İvedik, was also created for a short sketch in "Dikkat Şahan Çıkabilir."

Movie career 
After guest starring in Gen, a movie directed by his brother, Togan Gökbakar, he kick-started his movie career with his 2008 movie, Recep İvedik, also directed by Togan Gökbakar. The movie became the highest-grossing Turkish movie of all time, a record which was broken by its sequel, Recep İvedik 2, a year later. The series went on to shatter box office records with four more sequels. To this day, Recep İvedik 5 and Recep İvedik 4 are, in that order, highest-grossing movies of all time in Turkey. The series are also very popular in neighboring countries of Turkey and in Europe, especially in countries with significant Turkish population. 

In 2011, he and his brother Togan Gökbakar founded their own production company, Çamaşırhane Film.   

In 2013, he produced and starred in Celal ile Ceren with Ezgi Mola as co-star, a romantic comedy which was again very successful both commercially and critically. His other films include Osman Pazarlama in 2016 and Kayhan in 2018.   

He is producer and co-director of the 2020 movie, Zengo.

It is rumored that he has reached an agreement with Disney+ for the exclusive rights to his upcoming blockbuster, Recep İvedik 7.

Personal life 
He married Selin Gökbakar (née Ortaçlı) in 2015, the couple have two children together: Deniz Efe Gökbakar (b. November 30, 2015) and Ela Gökbakar (b. March 16, 2017)

He is an avid Galatasaray S.K. fan and a voting member of the club.

Environmental efforts 
During 2021 Turkey Wildfires, Gökbakar was very active both in the field and in social media, providing information from the ground and raising awareness about the importance of fire-fighting planes.

He opposed the mining activities at Mound Ida region and campaigned against it in 2019. In March 2022, he opposed the opening of olive groves to mining activities. Gökbakar said, "Olive trees are the wealth of this country. I invite the Ministry of Energy and Natural Resources to return from this mistake."

Portrayal of Recep İvedik

The success and influence of Recep İvedik has been the subject of countless debates and even academical research in both Turkey and abroad. Its success has spawned many similar movies and is considered as a cult series in Turkey. 

Recep İvedik, had according to Hürriyet Daily News reviewer Emrah Güler, enjoyed some moderate fame as the anti-hero in comedian Şahan Gökbakar’s sketch shows, generating a modest fan group on YouTube. Gökbakar teamed up with his younger brother Togan Gökbakar, who first made his name as a director with some short films and had always showed an interest in working with his older brother, to turn the character into a cash cow with a series of films, which proved to be the highest grossing movies in the respective years of their release and at the same time the most loathed films to come to screens in the minds of critics and intellectuals.

Filmography

Cinema movies

Television programs 
 Zoka (TV8 and Show TV) (2004)
 Dikkat Şahan Çıkabilir (TV8 and ATV) (2005)
 Leyt Nayt Şov: Kime Diyorum Ben (NTV) (2006)
 Kolay Gelsin (Kanal 1) (2008)

References

External links

Şahan Gökbakar on Youtube

1980 births
Living people
Turkish comedians
Turkish male film actors
Turkish male voice actors
Actors from İzmir
Bilkent University alumni